30th Street Station, officially William H. Gray III 30th Street Station, is a major intermodal transit station in Philadelphia, Pennsylvania. It is metropolitan Philadelphia's main railroad station and a major stop on Amtrak's Northeast and Keystone corridors. It was named in memory of U.S. representative William H. Gray III in 2020.

The station is also a major commuter rail station served by all SEPTA Regional Rail lines and is the western terminus for NJ Transit's Atlantic City Line. The station is also served by several SEPTA city and suburban buses and by NJ Transit, Amtrak Thruway, and intercity operators.

The station, which served more than four million inter-city rail passengers in 2018, is Amtrak's third-busiest, after Penn Station in Manhattan and Union Station in Washington, D.C., and the 12th-busiest train station in North America.

Description

The station is located at 2955 Market Street in Philadelphia's University City neighborhood, just across the Schuylkill River from Center City.  The building, which first opened in 1933, is listed on the National Register of Historic Places.

Amtrak's code for the station is PHL. Its IATA Airport Code is ZFV on United Airlines because Amtrak's service to Newark Liberty International Airport is code shared with United.

30th Street Station is Amtrak's third-busiest station in the nation, and by far the busiest of the 24 stations served in Pennsylvania, hosting 4,411,662 passengers in fiscal year 2017. On an average day in fiscal 2013, about 12,000 people boarded or left trains at 30th Street Station, nearly twice as many as from the rest of Pennsylvania stations combined.

History
The Pennsylvania Railroad (PRR), which was headquartered in Philadelphia, acquired tunnel rights from the Schuylkill River to 15th Street from the city of Philadelphia in return for land that the city needed to construct the Benjamin Franklin Parkway. This allowed the company to build both Suburban Station and the 30th Street Station, which replaced  Broad Street station as the latter was too small. Broad Street Station was a stub-end terminal in Center City where through trains had to back in and out, and the company wanted a location which would accommodate trains between New York City and Washington. D.C.  Broad St. station also handled a large commuter operation, which the new underground Suburban Station was built to handle. (Because of the Great Depression and World War II, Broad Street station remained open until 1952.)

The Chicago architectural firm of Graham, Anderson, Probst and White, the successor to D.H. Burnham & Company, designed the structure, originally known as Pennsylvania Station–30th Street in accord with the naming style of other Pennsylvania Stations.  Its design was influenced by the Northeast Corridor electrification that allowed trains to pass beneath the station without exposing passengers to soot as steam engines of earlier times had. The station had a number of innovative features, including a pneumatic tube system, an electronic intercom, and a reinforced roof with space for small aircraft to land, and contained a mortuary, a chapel and more than 3,000 square feet of hospital space.

Construction began in 1927 and the station opened in 1933, starting with two platform tracks.  The vast waiting room is faced with travertine and the coffered ceiling is painted gold, red and cream. The building's exterior has columned porte-cocheres on the west and east facade, and shows a balance between classical and modern architectural styles.

Until 1958, 30th Street Station was one of two major intercity stations in Philadelphia, the other being the Baltimore & Ohio Railroad's station on Chestnut Street. However, when the B&O ended all service north of Baltimore in 1958, 30th Street became the major intercity terminal in the Delaware Valley.

In the 1970s, Amtrak installed a Solari board (by Solari di Udine) in the main waiting room to display train departure information. On November 30, 2018, officials announced that the board — by then, the railroad's last remaining Solari device  — would be replaced with a digital board. A minor public outcry followed, and within days, Rep. Brendan Boyle urged Amtrak CEO Richard H. Anderson to reconsider. In January 2019, Amtrak sent the board to the Railroad Museum of Pennsylvania in Strasburg, reserving the right to reclaim it if it could be worked into the station's planned renovation. On February 28, 2019, the new digital board began operation. The Museum placed the Solari board on static display in July 2019; after the renovatation it will return as a design element.

Ben Franklin Station proposal
In 2005, Philadelphia-based Pew Charitable Trust asked Amtrak to change the name of 30th Street Station to "Ben Franklin Station" as part of the celebration of Ben Franklin's 300th birthday in January 2006. The cost of replacing signs at the station was estimated at $3 million.

In January, Philadelphia Mayor John Street threw his support behind the name change, but others had mixed reactions to the proposal. Pennsylvania Governor Ed Rendell, a former mayor of Philadelphia, was lukewarm, while Amtrak officials worried that a "Ben" station could be confused with its other three "Penn" stations. On January 25, 2006, Pew abandoned the campaign, giving no reason.

Renaming
In August 2014, Congress passed a law to rename the station to William H. Gray III 30th Street Station in honor of the late congressman. At the time, the change was to occur "in the next few months". In 2019, signs were installed outside the station with the new name and plans were announced for a statue of Gray and a memorial plaque. The name change officially took effect on February 6, 2020.

Present day

The building is owned by Amtrak and houses many Amtrak corporate offices, although Amtrak is officially headquartered near Union Station in Washington, D.C. The 562,000 ft² (52,000 m2) facility features a cavernous main passenger concourse with ornate Art Deco decor.

Prominently displayed is the Pennsylvania Railroad World War II Memorial, which honors Pennsylvania Railroad employees killed in World War II. It consists of a bronze statue of the archangel Michael lifting the body of a dead soldier out of the flames of war, and was sculpted by Walker Hancock in 1950. On the four sides of the base of that sculpture are the 1,307 names of those employees in alphabetical order.

The building was restored in 1991 by Dan Peter Kopple & Associates. When the station was renovated, updated retail amenities were added. They include several shops, a large food court, car rental facilities, Saxbys Coffee, Dunkin' Donuts, and others.

The Amtrak 30th Street Parking Garage was designed by BLT Architects and completed in 2004. This nine-level, double helix garage provides 2,100 parking spaces and glass-enclosed stair tower and elevator to offer views of Philadelphia.  The following year (2005) the Arch Street Pedestrian Bridge was completed and designed with contribution from BLT Architects. The Arch Street Pedestrian Bridge provides direct access for pedestrians from 30th Street Station to the parking garage and Cira Centre; this prevents pedestrians from interacting with heavy traffic from PA 3 and I-76.

Street access
Many important highways and streets pass next to or near the station. Vehicles and taxicabs can reach the station from various major routes, including Market Street (PA 3), Interstate 76 (Schuylkill Expressway), and Interstate 676 (Vine Street Expressway). The John F. Kennedy Boulevard Bridge is just east of the station.

Rail access

Trains from SEPTA, Amtrak, and NJ Transit serve the station. The three east-west Upper Level platforms serve SEPTA Regional Rail; all 13 Regional Rail lines stop at the station. It is one of three stations that are part of the Center City Commuter Connection. The north-south Lower Level platforms serve Amtrak trains, as well as NJ Transit's Atlantic City Line.

A pedestrian tunnel once directly connected the underground subway station with all five lower level passenger platforms of 30th Street Station. This was closed in the 1980s, reportedly due to safety concerns. SEPTA and Amtrak floated reopening the tunnel in the early 2000s, but the September 11 attacks derailed those plans.

A number of SEPTA bus routes stop at or near the station, including Routes 9, 30, 31, 44, 49, 62, 124, 125, and LUCY (Loop through University City).

Cira Centre
Cira Centre, a 28-story glass-and-steel office tower opened in October 2005, is across Arch Street to the north and is connected by a skyway at the station's mezzanine level next to the upper-level SEPTA Regional Rail platforms. The tower is owned by Philadelphia-based Brandywine Realty Trust, was designed by architect César Pelli and BLT Architects, and sits on land leased from Amtrak.

Station facilities

Metropolitan Lounge
The station has an Amtrak Metropolitan Lounge, which is accessible to Amtrak Guest Rewards Select Plus and Select Executive members, Acela Express first-class passengers, sleeping car passengers on overnight trains, and private railcar owners and lessees when the car is being hauled by Amtrak.

Rental cars and car sharing
Budget Rent a Car, National, Avis, Alamo, and Hertz Rent A Car rent cars at counters in 30th Street Station.

Zipcar vehicles are parked outside 30th Street Station, mostly in reserved parking spaces on the south side of the station or, during construction, in the controlled-access parking lot outside Cira Centre.

Upper level platform layout
All SEPTA Regional Rail trains depart from the upper level of the station.

In popular culture
30th Street Station is featured in at least ten movies, Glass (2019), The Visit (2015), The Happening (2008), Unbreakable (2000), Witness (1985), Trading Places (1983), Blow Out (1981), 'Marnie (1964), The Burglar (1957), and Pride of the Marines (1945).

In television, the station is featured in the recurring opening credits of It's Always Sunny in Philadelphia and in Agents of S.H.I.E.L.D. (season 2, episode 7). It also appears in the 2010 video game Heavy Rain''.

Gallery

References

External links

30th Street Station at SEPTA
30th Street Station at NJ Transit
Historic American Engineering Record (HAER) documentation:

Google Maps Street View: Schyulkill Avenue (eastern entrance), 30th Street (western entrance), Market Street (southern entrance)

1933 establishments in Pennsylvania
Philadelphia
Art Deco railway stations
Former Pennsylvania Railroad stations
Historic American Engineering Record in Philadelphia
Philadelphia
Railway stations in Philadelphia
Railway stations in the United States opened in 1933
Railway stations located underground in Pennsylvania
Railway stations on the National Register of Historic Places in Philadelphia
Sculptures by Karl Bitter
SEPTA Regional Rail stations
Philadelphia 30th
Philadelphia 30th
Terminating vistas in the United States
Transit centers in the United States
Transit hubs serving New Jersey
University City, Philadelphia
Wilmington/Newark Line